Cara Black and Sania Mirza defeated the defending champions Hsieh Su-wei and Peng Shuai in the final, 6–1, 6–0 to win the doubles tennis title at the 2014 WTA Finals.

Seeds

Draw

Finals

References 
Main Draw

Finals
2014 doubles